The Junk Yard Band is a Washington, D.C based go-go band, founded in the early 1980s by children playing on improvised instruments. They are best known for their songs- "Sardines" and "The Word."

Biography
The band was formed in 1980 by children, ranging in age from 8 to 13, living in the Barry Farm government housing project in Washington, D.C. They were inspired to play after witnessing the performances of local go-go bands in their neighborhood. Not having resources to purchase traditional instruments, the children instead scoured their neighborhood in search of objects that could emulate the sound of real instruments: hubcaps, plastic buckets, crates, cans, and discarded pots and pans - these types of GoGo bands became known as "Bucket Bands". After a few informal performances in Barry Farm, the group was dubbed the "Junk Yard Band" by locals. This is perhaps a reference to the animated television program, Fat Albert and the Cosby Kids, whose band "The Junk Yard Gang" also performed on improvised instruments.

With go-go music gaining in popularity, and the band gaining local notoriety, the band began booking performances at schools, recreation centers, fundraisers, and government agencies. The band was often seen performing for tourists on the streets of Washington, D.C. This popularity led to appearances in a 1984 Cavalier Men's Store television advertisement, the 1983 film D.C. Cab and the 1988 film Tougher Than Leather with Run-D.M.C. It was this interaction with Run-D.M.C.'s DJ Run that led to an eventual recording contract with older brother Russell Simmons' Def Jam Recordings.

Far from being a novelty act, "Junk Yard" can be thought of as the creators of the "new school" in terms of their contribution to the world of go-go. Before them, every go-go band of any significance had a horn section, bass guitar player, and most likely a lead guitar player also. Early Junk Yard had none of these but instead developed a characteristic layered percussion sound based on improvised instruments.

However, by 1986, the only contributing improvised instruments were plastIC buckets and other things in replication of the standard go-go three roto-tom/two timbales configuration.  That year, the band scored their first major hit, and arguably their signature song, "Sardines," which earned them airplay outside of the D.C. market.

In 1992, original member and drummer "Heavy One" was gunned down in the same Barry Farms projects where the band perfected their bucket band style.

Recording career
DefJam released the band's song "Sardines" as a single in 1986. The song received considerable airplay, and the band embarked on a tour of the United States as an opening act for acts such as Guy, Salt-n-Pepa, Tupac Shakur, The Roots, and labelmates Beastie Boys and Slayer. No longer viewed simply as a novelty act, the group performed at such prestigious venues as the Kennedy Center and the Apollo Theater.

The group signed with Street Records, a Motown Records subsidiary, in 1992.

Discography

Albums

Singles and EPs

Many bootleg tapes and cds of the band's live shows are in circulation. Although recordings exist from throughout the band's existence, recordings from the band's prime era (1987–1997) are the most sought-after.

References

External links
[ Junk Yard Band] at AllMusic.

Go-go musical groups
Musical groups established in 1980
Musical groups from Washington, D.C.
1980 establishments in Washington, D.C.